Daniel Hubmann (born 16 April 1983 in Eschlikon, Thurgau) is a Swiss orienteering competitor, world champion in all three individual disciplines and multiple winner of the overall Orienteering World Cup. He is the brother of Martin Hubmann. Daniel also has his own fan club which is run by New Zealand Orienteer Joseph Lynch.

Career

Early results
Hubmann received a silver medal at the Sprint World Orienteering Championships in 2005, and again in 2006, and a bronze medal in the relay event in 2005 as member of the Swiss Relay team. He became Junior World Champion in 2002 in Alicante, both in the long distance and with the Swiss relay team.

2008
Hubmann won the men's overall World Cup in 2008, before Thierry Gueorgiou and Matthias Merz.

He won the long distance at the 2008 World Orienteering Championships in Olomouc (before Anders Nordberg), and finished second in the sprint event after Andrey Khramov. He received a bronze medal in the relay event with the Swiss team, together with Baptiste Rollier and Matthias Merz.

He also had success in the European Orienteering Championships, receiving three silver medals.

2009
In the 2009 season, Hubmann, together with teammate Matthias Merz, became the first man to take World Championship medals in all four orienteering disciplines. He accomplished this feat by earning the silver medal in the middle distance at the World Championships in Miskolc, Hungary on 19 August 2009. He followed this up a day later by winning the bronze medal in the sprint distance. In addition Hubmann anchored Kristiansand OK's relay teams to victory in both Tiomila and Jukola. After transferring to Koovee orienteering club he anchored the team to victory in Jukola in 2016 and 2018.

World ranking
Hubmann was ranked no. 1 on the IOF (International Orienteering Federation) World Ranking per October 2006, and was also ranked no. 1 on the list at the end of the 2008 season (per 10 October 2008). For a brief period in 2015 he was ranked as no. 1 in both Sprint, and Classic orienteering.

World Championship results

References

External links

1983 births
Living people
Swiss orienteers
Male orienteers
Foot orienteers
World Orienteering Championships medalists
World Games gold medalists
World Games silver medalists
Competitors at the 2009 World Games
Competitors at the 2013 World Games
Competitors at the 2005 World Games
World Games medalists in orienteering
Sportspeople from Thurgau
Junior World Orienteering Championships medalists